Situation: Comedy is a reality show that aired on the Bravo network from July 26 until September 9, 2005. It was produced by Sean Hayes and Todd Milliner.  The winner of the series was "Stephen's Life". The runner up was "The Sperm Donor".

The Sperm Donor
"The Sperm Donor" was written by Mark Treitel and Shoe Schuster and directed by Amanda Bearse.  It starred Maggie Wheeler, David DeLuise, Richie Keen, and Lauren Schaffel.

External links
Situation: Comedy page at BravoTV.com

2000s American reality television series
2005 American television series debuts
2005 American television series endings